This is a list of Tamil language films produced in the Tamil cinema in India that were released in 2022.

Box office collection 
 
The list of highest-grossing Tamil films released in 2022, by worldwide box office gross revenue

Released films

January – March

April – June

July – September

October – December

Notes

References

External links 

Tamil
2022
Tamil